"Don't Need No Money" is the debut single of singer Imani Williams (also known mononymously as Imani). It was released on 1 July 2016 through Sony Music Entertainment. It features house DJs and music producers Sigala and Blonde. As well as being Imani's first song as lead artist, the single was the first project involving Sigala and Blonde in collaboration. Imani gained inspiration for the track based on involvement in the 2016 single "Say You Do", upon which Sigala worked alongside drum and bass music producer DJ Fresh.

Charts

References

2016 singles
2016 songs
Blonde (duo) songs
Sigala songs
Songs written by Sigala
Tropical house songs
Songs written by Jacob Manson
Songs written by Hampus Lindvall